The 2019–20 Skeleton World Cup was a multi-race series over a season for skeleton. The season started on 7 December in Lake Placid, US and finished on 16 February 2020 in Sigulda, Latvia. The World Cup was organised by the International Bobsleigh and Skeleton Federation, who also run World Cups and Championships in bobsleigh. The title sponsor of the World Cup was again BMW.

Calendar 

The first race weekend of the season was originally scheduled to be at Park City, but due to a problem with the refrigeration system there, the races were relocated to Lake Placid.

Anticipated schedule as announced by the IBSF:

Results

Men

Women

Standings

Men

Women

Medal table

References 

Skeleton World Cup
2019 in skeleton
2020 in skeleton